In geometry, the gyroelongated square bipyramid, heccaidecadeltahedron, or tetrakis square antiprism is one of the Johnson solids. As the name suggests, it can be constructed by gyroelongating an octahedron (square bipyramid) by inserting a square antiprism between its congruent halves. It is one of the eight strictly-convex deltahedra.

The dual of the gyroelongated square bipyramid is a square truncated trapezohedron with 10 faces: 8 pentagons and 2 square.

See also 
 Gyroelongated bipyramid
 Gyroelongated square pyramid

References

External links
 

Johnson solids
Deltahedra
Pyramids and bipyramids